River Volley is an Italian women's volleyball club based in Piacenza and currently playing in the Serie A1.

Previous names
Due to sponsorship, the club have competed under the following names:
 River Volley (1983–1994)
 Libertas-River Volley (1994–1998)
 Rebecchi River Volley (1998–2003)
 Rebecchi River Volley Rivergaro (2003–2005)
 Rebecchi Rivergaro Piacenza (2005–2006)
 Rebecchi Cariparma Piacenza Volley (2006–2007)
 RebecchiLupa Piacenza (2007–2010)
 Rebecchi Nordmeccanica Piacenza (2010–2014)
 Nordmeccanica Rebecchi Piacenza (2014–2015)
 Nordmeccanica Piacenza (2015–2016)
 Liu Jo Nordmeccanica Modena (2016–present)

History
It had only youth team activities until 1988 when a senior team was created and the club started competing in the lower divisions in Italy. By the early 2000s the club was playing in the third and second divisions of the Italian league, and decided to move its professional senior activities to Piacenza keeping the youth activities in Rivergaro. It reached the Serie A1 for the first time in 2006, after winning promotion at the end of the 2005–06 season. It was relegated in its first season at Serie A1 but returned to the highest league for the 2009–10 season. The club started to become competitive in the Serie A1, winning the league, cup and supercup in both 2012–13 and 2013–14 seasons.

In May 2016, an agreement between River Volley and Liu Jo Modena (LJ Volley) was announced, following LJ Volley decision to stop its volleyball activities. In the agreement River Volley acquired LJ Volley assets (players and rights to play at the PalaPanini) with Liu Jo becoming River's main sponsor and the club being renamed . The club remain based in Piacenza but its home matches moved from PalaBanca to be played at the PalaPanini in Modena.

Team
Season 2017–2018, as of September 2017.

Honours

National competitions
  National League: 2
2012–13, 2013–14

  Coppa Italia: 2
2012–13, 2013–14

  Italian Super Cup: 2
2013, 2014

References

External links

Official website 

Italian women's volleyball clubs
Volleyball clubs established in 1983
1983 establishments in Italy
Piacenza
Sport in Emilia-Romagna
Serie A1 (women's volleyball) clubs